Sierra Leone competed at the 1996 Summer Olympics in Atlanta, United States.

Results by event

Athletics

Men 

Track and road events

Women 

Track and road events

Field events

Combined events – Heptathlon

Boxing

Swimming 

Men

References
Official Olympic Reports

Nations at the 1996 Summer Olympics
1996
Oly